Jamali Maddix (born 15 April 1991) is an English stand-up comedian. He appears as a regular panellist on the reboot of Never Mind the Buzzcocks and appeared on series 11 of Taskmaster.

Early life
Maddix was born in Ilford, East London. He attended the University of Salford, where he studied theatre. He took leave from the course when he contracted a blood infection from a tattoo, and ultimately dropped out to pursue comedy as a career.

Career

Maddix won the Chortle Student Comedian of the Year award in 2014.

In July 2022, Maddix's podcast Spooky Shit won the title of Best Comedy Podcast at the British Podcast Awards.

Hate Thy Neighbor
Maddix hosted a documentary series on extremism titled Hate Thy Neighbor in partnership with Vice in 2016.  In the series, Maddix interviews extremists from around the world to understand how they think. These extremists include members of hate groups such as NSM, Azov, Nordic Youth, Black Hebrew Israelites and the EDL.

Taskmaster
Maddix appeared on series 11 of Taskmaster, which was broadcast from April to May 2021.  He came in fourth place.

Personal life
Maddix is dyslexic and dyspraxic.

His father is Jamaican and his mother's father is Greek, although for many years he had believed him to be Italian. In an episode of Big Zuu's Big Eats, recorded 12 December 2019, he said "My dad is Jamaican, my mum didn't know her pops and she always told me he was Italian, for some reason. I don't know, she said he's Italian, that's all she'll say, 'Ah, he's Italian.' And I remember, I was talking to mum one day and she goes, 'Ah no, he was Greek.' So, now I'm a quarter Greek, but I never knew I was a quarter Greek until now and, you know, all right."
Jamali has stated on numerous occasions during his stand-up performances and tv appearances that he considers himself to be a Buddhist.

As of 2016, he still lived in Ilford with his mother.

References

External links 

Living people
Black British male comedians
English people of Jamaican descent
English people of Greek descent
English stand-up comedians
21st-century British comedians
1991 births
People with dyslexia